The following lists events that happened during 1886 in Australia.

Incumbents

Premiers
 Premier of New South Wales – John Robertson (until 25 February) then Patrick Jenning
 Premier of Queensland – Samuel Griffith
 Premier of South Australia – John Downer
 Premier of Tasmania – Adye Douglas (til 8 March) then James Agnew
 Premier of Victoria – James Service (til 18 February) then Duncan Gillies

Governors
 Governor of New South Wales – Lord Carrington
 Governor of Queensland – Anthony Musgrave
 Governor of South Australia – William Robinson
 Governor of Tasmania – George Strahan
 Governor of Victoria – Henry Brougham Loch, 1st Baron Loch
 Governor of the Crown Colony of Western Australia – Sir Frederick Broome

Events
 25 January – The first assembly of the Federal Council of Australasia is held in Hobart.
 30 May – The SS Ly-Ee-Moon sinks off Green Cape, New South Wales, with the loss of 71 persons.
 12 June – William Spence chairs a meeting of shearers in Ballarat, Victoria at which the Australian Shearers Union is formed, an ancestor of the Australian Workers' Union.

Undated
 Queen Victoria grants the Cocos (Keeling) Islands to the Clunies Ross family.

Arts and literature

Sport
 November – Arsenal wins the Melbourne Cup
 England defeats Australia 3–0 in The Ashes

Births
 3 January – Arthur Mailey (died 1967), cricketer and journalist
 4 May – Aubrey Abbott (died 1975), politician and administrator of the Northern Territory
 28 November – Margaret McIntyre (died 1948), politician

Deaths
 4 November – James Martin (born 1820), Premier of New South Wales

References

 
Australia
Years of the 19th century in Australia